Broadgate is a  housing estate close to the village of Walkington, England. Broadgate forms part of the civil parish of Walkington.

Broadgate was the location of the Broadgate Hospital. The land the hospital was built upon was sold by nearby Broadgate Farm, the farm buildings are now converted into a small complex of luxury holiday cottages. After the hospital had been demolished, the former hospital site was redeveloped by Bryant Homes to create the current hamlet.

References

Further reading

Villages in the East Riding of Yorkshire